Air Class Líneas Aéreas is a cargo airline based in Montevideo, Uruguay. It operates freight and scheduled/charter passenger services. Its main base is Carrasco International Airport in Montevideo.

History

The airline, established in 1996 and began operating in 1997 as an air taxi service. It started scheduled flights between Montevideo and Buenos Aires in 2000, with further destinations added later.

Destinations
As of March 2007, Air Class operates passenger and freight services between Montevideo and Buenos Aires, as well as charter flights to Brazil, Paraguay and Chile. The company has a contract with DHL and some of their aircraft carry the DHL logo on the side.

Partners
Air Class operates flights on behalf of other airlines:

Air Europa (Madrid via Buenos Aires)
Kalitta Air (Miami via Santiago)

Fleet

Current fleet

As of August 2022, The Air Class Líneas Aéreas fleet consists of the following aircraft (Also refer to Airliners.net and Jetphotos.com).

Former fleet
The carrier also operated the following aircraft types throughout its history:

1 Embraer EMB 110P1 Bandeirante

Accidents and incidents

On June 6, 2012, a Fairchild SA227AC Metro III (registered CX-LAS) performing a freight flight on behalf of DHL from Montevideo to Buenos Aires, disappeared south of the Isla de Flores. So far, parts of the nose gear have been located, with priority now given to locating the remains of the two crew members. On August 2, 2012, the Navy of Uruguay reported that the cockpit voice recorder had been recovered from the aircraft, along with the remains of an engine, the tailcone, and some other portions of the aircraft.

See also
List of airlines of Uruguay

References

External links

Airlines of Uruguay
Airlines established in 1996
1996 establishments in Uruguay
Transport in Montevideo
Companies based in Montevideo